The Society of Local Council Clerks (SLCC) is the professional body for Local Council Clerks. As of 2017, it represents the Clerks to over 5,000 councils.

History
The SLCC was formed in  1972 at a side meeting held during the National Association of Local Councils conference. It started with under 50 member Clerks and has steadily grown. In 2001, the National Executive Council took the decision to appoint professional officers to run the society which has seen it grow to serve over 5000 councils with a turnover of over £1,000,000.

The Society is governed by a Board of 18 Directors.

Membership 
Full Member - Full members receive all the services the Society has to offer. 

Principal Member - Principal members receive all the services the Society has to offer (as with full membership above).

References

Parish councils of England